Pasuk Phongpaichit (born 11 February 1946) is a Thai economist.  A professor at Chulalongkorn University, she is the author of several books on corruption in Thailand.

Pasuk earned BA and MA degrees in economics at Monash University in Australia, and received her PhD at Cambridge University in England. Her books include A History of Thailand, Thaksin: The Business of Politics in Thailand, and Thailand's Crisis (with Chris Baker), and Guns, Girls, Gambling, Ganja (with Sungsidh Piriyarangsan and Nualnoi Treerat).

A critic of former Premier Thaksin Shinawatra, she was appointed an advisor to the military junta that overthrew his government, but declined the position.

Pasuk was the recipient of the 2017 Fukuoka Prize together with her spouse and collaborator, Chris Baker. The prize is awarded annually to those who have made outstanding contributions to academia, arts, and culture in Asia.

Selected works in English
 Pasuk Phongpaichit and Chris Baker, eds. Thai Capitalism after the 1997 Crisis. Chiang Mai: Silkworm Books, 2008.
 
 Pasuk Phongpaichit and Chris Baker. Thailand: Economy and Politics. Kuala Lumpur: Oxford University Press, 1995. Reprint 1997, 1999. Also in Thai. Rev ed, 2002
 
 Pasuk Phongpaichit, Sungsidh Piriyarangsan, and Nualnoi Treerat. Guns, Girls, Gambling, Ganja: Thailand's Illegal Economy and Public Policy. Chiang Mai: Silkworm Books,  and Washington University Press, 1998.
 
 Pasuk Phongpaichit and Sungsidh Piriyarangsan. Corruption and Democracy in Thailand.  Bangkok: Political Economy Centre, Chulalongkorn University, 1994; 2nd ed by Silkworm Books, Chiang Mai, Thailand 1996.
 Pasuk Phongpaichit and Shigeru Itoga, eds. The Informal Sector in Thai Economic Development. Tokyo: Institute of Developing Economies, 1992 (Also available in Japanese, 1993).
 From Peasant Girls to Bangkok Masseuses. Geneva: ILO, 1982. (Also available in Japanese, 1991). Fourth impression, 1988.
 
 
 
 Baker, Chris and Phongpaichit, Pasuk. A History of Ayutthaya: Siam in the Early Modern World. Cambridge: Cambridge University Press, 2017.
 Baker, Chris and Phongpaichit, Pasuk. From the Fifty Jataka: Selections from the Thai Pannasa Jataka. Chiang Mai: Silkworm Books, 2019.

References

External links
 Pasuk Phongpaichit website

Living people
Pasuk Phongpaichit
Thai studies scholars
Year of birth missing (living people)